Suzabad is census town in Varanasi tehsil of  Varanasi district in the Indian state of Uttar Pradesh. The census town falls under  the Sujabad gram panchayat.  Suzabad is about 7 kilometers South-East of Varanasi railway station, 330 kilometers South-East of  Lucknow and 7 kilometers North of Ramnagar Fort.

Demography
Suzabad has 2,514 families with a total population of 15,384. Sex ratio of the census town is 867 and child sex ratio is 903. Uttar Pradesh state average for both ratios is 912 and 902 respectively  .

Transportation
Suzabad  is connected by air (Lal Bahadur Shastri Airport), by train (Kashi railway station) and by road. Nearest operational airports is Lal Bahadur Shastri Airport and nearest operational railway station is Kashi railway station (27 and 2 kilometers respectively from Suzabad).

See also
 Varanasi tehsil
 Varanasi district
 Varanasi South
 Varanasi (Lok Sabha constituency)

Notes
  All  demographic data is based on 2011 Census of India.

References 

Census towns in Varanasi district
Cities and towns in Varanasi district